Sleepy Eye Lake may refer to:
Sleepy Eye Lake (Brown County, Minnesota)
Sleepy Eye Lake (Le Sueur County, Minnesota)